Kamāl al-Dīn Abū ʾl-Ḳāsim ʿUmar ibn Aḥmad ibn Hibat Allāh Ibn al-ʿAdīm (1192–1262) was an Arab biographer and historian from Aleppo. He is best known for his work Bughyat al-Talab fī Tārīkh Ḥalab (Everything Desirable about the History of Aleppo), a multi-volume collection of biographies of famous men from Aleppo, introduced with a volume on the geography and traditions of the region. It is saved in part in manuscripts in the library of sultan Ahmed III in Topkapi Palace. He also published a chronicle version of the work, Zubdat al-Halab fi ta'arikh Halab (The Cream of the History of Aleppo), a copy of which reached the library of Jean-Baptiste Colbert and then the Bibliothèque nationale de France, and selections of which were published with Latin translation by Georg Freytag in 1819. His historical sources are various, some oral and some written, and two of the more famous are Usama ibn Munqidh and Ibn al-Qalanisi (Lewis 1952). Another work is a guide for the making of perfumes Kitab al-Wuslat (or Wasilat) ila-l- Habib fi Wasf al-Tayibat wal-tibb (Houtsma 1927). He is an important source of knowledge on the Syrian Assassins, first analyzed by Silvester de Sacy (Lewis 1952).

Numerous Ayyubid rulers entrusted Ibn al-Adim as a diplomatic ambassador. On his last mission in 1260, he was sent to Egypt seeking military assistance against the Mongols.

Notes

References
Freytag, G. Selecta ex historia Halebi Paris: Typographia Regia, 1819.
Kamāl al-Dīn (1896): Histoire d'Alep,   in Revue de l'Orient Latin
Kamāl al-Dīn ʻUmar ibn Aḥmad Ibn al-ʻAdīm, Edgar Blochet  (1900): Histoire d'Alep
Houtsma, M. Th., ed. E. J. Brill's first encyclopaedia of Islam 1913-1936, BRILL, 
Ibn al-'Adîm, Bughyat al-talab fî târîkh Halab / Everything desirable about the History of Aleppo. Set of 11 volumes: I-X. ed. F. Sezgin; XI. Register of Biographies, compiled by David W. Morray. 1986-1990.  
Lewis, Bernard, "The Sources for the History of the Syrian Assassins", Speculum Vol. 27, No. 4 (Oct., 1952), pp. 475–489
Morray, David W., An Ayyubid Notable and his World: Ibn al-'Adim and Aleppo as Portrayed in His Biographical Dictionary of People Associated with the City, Leiden: E.J. Brill, 1994

People from Aleppo
1192 births
1262 deaths
13th-century Arabs
13th-century Syrian historians
Syrian Muslims